Defending champion Diede de Groot defeated Aniek van Koot in the final, 6–1, 6–1 to win the women's singles wheelchair tennis title at the 2022 Australian Open.

Seeds

Draw

Bracket

References

External links
 Drawsheet on ausopen.com

Wheelchair Women's Singles
2022 Women's Singles